WTWV may refer to:

 WTWV, a television station in Memphis, Tennessee

The following stations have previously used the WTWV call sign:

 WFRQ, Cape Cod, Massachusetts
 WTVA, Tupelo, Mississippi
 WPPN, Chicago, Illinois